Miroslav Pribanić (born 22 June 1946 in Bjelovar) was a Croatian handball player who competed in the 1972 Summer Olympics.

He was part of the Yugoslav team which won the gold medal at the Munich Games. He played all six matches and scored twelve goals.

He played for Croatian squad Partizan from Bjelovar, that ruled Croatian, Yugoslav and European handball in the 1970s.

External links
 profile

1946 births
Living people
Yugoslav male handball players
Croatian male handball players
Olympic handball players of Yugoslavia
Handball players at the 1972 Summer Olympics
Olympic gold medalists for Yugoslavia
Olympic medalists in handball
Medalists at the 1972 Summer Olympics
Sportspeople from Bjelovar